The Twelve Gold Medallions (Chinese: 十二金牌) is a 1970 Hong Kong wuxia film directed by Cheng Gang and produced by the Shaw Brothers Studio, starring Yueh Hua, Chin Ping, Cheng Miu, Lisa Chiao Chiao and Fan Mei-sheng.

Cast
Yueh Hua as Wavering Sword Miao Lung
Chin Ping as Jin Suo
Cheng Miu as Jin Yantang
Lisa Chiao Chiao as Jin Huan
Wang Hsieh as Golden Fan Ma Shanting
Wong Chung-shun as Golden Whip Lei Ting
Yeung Chi-hing as Smiling Fox Sung Qicheng
Ku Feng as Ah Gui
Liu Wai as Hu Quan
Goo Man-chung as Green Bamboo Cane Meng Dabei
Jeng Man-jing as Meng Xiang
Fan Mei-sheng as Bangling Trio
Tong Tin-hei as Bangling Trio
Ma Ying as Bangling Trio
Go Ming as Leader of 10 Swords of Qingshan
Wang Kuang-yu as one of 10 Swords of Qingshan
Shum Lo as Fulai innkeeper
Lee Kwan as Fulai inn waiter
Law Hon as Miser Wang
Poon Oi-lun as horseshoe proprietress
Lee Wan-chung as Official Man
Hung Lau as 1st gold medallion messenger killed
Wong Chung as Mountain Slicing Quad
Yuen Woo-ping as Mountain Slicing Quad
Yuen Cheung-yan as Mountain Slicing Quad
Chui Chung-hok as Mountain Slicing Quad
Wong Wai as Lei Ting's thug
Yeung Pak-chan as Lei Ting's thug
Chan Siu-gai as Lei Ting's thug
Tam Bo as Lei Ting's thug
Hsu Hsia as one of 10 Swords of Qingshan
Cham Siu-hung as archer trying to kill Lei Ting
Wong Mei as Juxian Hall thug in bridge ambush
Lo Wai as Juxian Hall thug in bridge ambush
Wong Ching as Juxian Hall thug in bridge ambush
James Tien as Juxian Hall member in final scene
Chin Chun as Juxian Hall member (long hair)
Lam Yuen as Juxian Hall member
Hao Li-jen as villager collecting dead heroes with a cart
Kwan Yan as villager
Tam Ying as villager
Mama Hung as villager
Man Man as inn guest
Chan Man
Chan Kwok
Yuen Shun-yi
Tung Choi-bo

External links

1970 films
1970s action films
Hong Kong martial arts films
Shaw Brothers Studio films
Wuxia films
Films set in 12th-century Song dynasty
1970s Hong Kong films